Julio Cusurichi Palacios is a leading Peruvian environmentalist from the Madre de Dios region of Peru. He was one of the recipients of the 2007 Goldman Environmental Prize.

References

External links
 2007 Goldman Environmental Prize winner.

Living people
Peruvian environmentalists
Peruvian people of Quechua descent
1971 births
Goldman Environmental Prize awardees